Lock and Dam No. 12 is a lock and dam located on the Upper Mississippi River at Bellevue, Iowa, United States. It connects to a  storage yard and continues toward the Illinois shore with a  non-submersible dike, a  submersible dike and a  non-submersible dike. The non-submersible sections are separated from the submersible section with two  transitional dikes. There is also an incomplete auxiliary lock. In 2004, the facility was listed in the National Register of Historic Places as Lock and Dam No. 12 Historic District, #04000172 covering  , 1 building, 3 structures, and 4 objects.

See also
Savanna Army Depot, adjoining the facility on the Illinois side
 Public Works Administration dams list
Upper Mississippi River National Wildlife and Fish Refuge

References

External links
Lock and Dam No. 12 - U.S. Army Corps of Engineers
USGS Pool 12

Transportation buildings and structures in Jackson County, Iowa
Buildings and structures in Jo Daviess County, Illinois
Mississippi River locks
Driftless Area
Historic American Engineering Record in Illinois
Historic American Engineering Record in Iowa
National Register of Historic Places in Jackson County, Iowa
12
12
12
Transportation buildings and structures in Jo Daviess County, Illinois
Transport infrastructure completed in 1939
Roller dams
Gravity dams
Dams on the Mississippi River
Mississippi Valley Division
Historic districts on the National Register of Historic Places in Iowa
Bellevue, Iowa
12
Historic districts in Jackson County, Iowa